Robert Butler (born November 16, 1927) is an American film and Emmy Award-winning television director. He is best known for his work in television, where he directed the pilots for a number of series including Star Trek, Hogan's Heroes,  Batman and Hill Street Blues.

Career 
Butler graduated from University of California, Los Angeles (UCLA), where he majored in English. He was first in an army band, before his career as a stage manager and an assistant before launching his directing career with an episode of Hennesey (starring Jackie Cooper and including a young Ron Howard) and then went on to direct such shows as The Untouchables, Dr. Kildare, The Dick Van Dyke Show, Batman, The Fugitive and The Twilight Zone.

Butler shot pilots for many TV series including the original Star Trek, Shane, Hogan's Heroes, Batman, The Blue Knight, Hill Street Blues, Remington Steele (a show which he also co-created), Moonlighting, Sisters, and Lois & Clark: The New Adventures of Superman.

Butler has also directed episodes for many other shows, including Bonanza, I Spy, Blue Light, The Invaders, Gunsmoke, The Outcasts, Mission: Impossible, Kung Fu, Hawaii Five-O, Columbo: Publish or Perish, Columbo: Double Shock,  and Midnight Caller.

He directed actor Kurt Russell in four Walt Disney movies, including Guns in the Heather, The Computer Wore Tennis Shoes and The Barefoot Executive.

Butler has won two Emmy Awards for outstanding directing, the first in 1973 for The Blue Knight pilot, and the second in 1981 for his Hill Street Blues premiere.

In 2014 Butler's work was the subject of a career retrospective at the UCLA Film and Television Archive.

Butler was honored by the Directors Guild of America (DGA) with a Lifetime Achievement Award for Distinguished Achievement in Television Direction in February 2015.

Filmography

Films

Television

References

External links

1927 births
Living people
American television directors
Primetime Emmy Award winners
Film directors from Los Angeles
Directors Guild of America Award winners
University of California, Los Angeles alumni